The 2019 Deutschland Tour was a road cycling stage race that took place between 29 August and 1 September 2019. This year's edition of the Deutschland Tour was the 34th edition and was rated as a 2.HC event as part of the 2019 UCI Europe Tour. After taking the lead in the overall classification after stage 3, Belgian Jasper Stuyven of  held off Sonny Colbrelli and Yves Lampaert, who finished second and third overall respectively, on the final stage to take the overall victory.

Teams
A total of 22 teams with 6 riders each participated in the event: 15 UCI WorldTeams, 3 UCI Professional Continental teams and 4 UCI Continental Teams.

UCI WorldTeams

 
 
 
 
 
 
 
 
 
 
 
 
 
 
 

UCI Professional Continental Teams

 
 
 

UCI Continental Teams

Route

The route of the 2019 Deutschland Tour went through central Germany and crossed through 4 German states. It started in Hannover, Lower Saxony and crossed through Saxony-Anhalt and Hesse before finishing in Erfurt, Thuringia.

Stages

Stage 1
29 August 2019 — Hannover to Halberstadt,

Stage 2
30 August 2019 — Marburg to Göttingen,

Stage 3
31 August 2019 — Göttingen to Eisenach,

Stage 4
1 September 2019 — Eisenach to Erfurt,

Classification leadership

Classification standings

General classification

Points classification

Mountains classification

Young rider classification

Team classification

References

External links

2019 Deutschland Tour
Deutschland Tour
Deutschland Tour
Deutschland Tour
Deutschland Tour